"Don't Be Stupid (You Know I Love You)" is a song by Canadian country music singer Shania Twain. It was released in November 1997 as the second single from Twain's album Come On Over but was the seventh to be released to international markets. The song was written by Robert John "Mutt" Lange and Shania Twain. The single peaked at number six on the US Billboard Hot Country Singles & Tracks chart, becoming Twain's sixth top-10 hit on that chart, and peaked at No. 5 in the UK in 2000. The song was later released as her last single to European and Australian markets in 2000.

Composition
According to the sheet music published at Musicnotes.com by Songs of Polygram International, Inc., "Don't Be Stupid" is written in the key of D major with Shania Twain's vocals spanning from A3 to B5. The song moves at a moderate tempo.

Music video
In June 1997, Twain held auditions for clog dancers. In August 1997, it was reported that Larry Jordan would be directing the music video, which Twain confirmed herself in early October 1997. From October 18 to 19 of that year, the music video was shot and it debuted on November 12, 1997 on CMT. The video is set on a stage that is covered in water, and Twain is accompanied by backup Irish dancers following the Riverdance trend of the time and children playing fiddles. By the end of the video, the sprinklers come on, and everyone, including Twain and the Riverdancers, are soaked. "Don't Be Stupid" won the Video of the Year award at the 1998 Canadian Country Music Awards. Three versions of the video exist, the 'Original Album Version', and one released in Europe in 2000 of the 'Dance Mix Single' are the most common. The 'Original Album Version' is available on Twain's compilations Come On Over: Video Collection (1999) and The Platinum Collection (2001). The 'Dance Mix' version is available on iTunes and YouTube.

Reception

Critical reception
Billboard magazine called the single a "weak song" but predicted it would do well commercially nonetheless. The magazine criticized the immaturity of the song's lyrics and said the production was subpar.

Chart performance
"Don't Be Stupid" debuted at number 51 on the US Billboard Hot Country Singles & Tracks chart the week of November 15, 1997, the highest debut of the week. The single spent 20 weeks on the chart and peaked at number six on January 31, 1998, where it remained for two weeks. It reached number two on the Country Singles Sales chart. The single became Twain's sixth Top 10 single and her eighth Top 20 hit. "Don't Be Stupid" became Twain's sixth song on the Billboard Hot 100 where it peaked at number 40. It reached number 25 on the Hot 100 Singles Sales chart. In Canada, the song reached number 12.

"Don't Be Stupid" became Twain's fourth-biggest single in the UK. It also became her fourth consecutive top-10 single there (and fifth overall) when it debuted on February 26, 2000, at its peak of number five. It remained on the chart for 11 weeks. It has sold 155,000 copies in the UK.

Track listings

Canadian and US single
 "Don't Be Stupid (You Know I Love You)" – 3:35
 "If It Don't Take Two" – 3:40

Australasian CD single
 "Don't Be Stupid (You Know I Love You)" (dance mix single) – 4:11
 "Man! I Feel Like a Woman!" (Live/Direct TV mix) – 3:57
 "You've Got a Way" (Love to Infinity's soul classic) – 6:00
 "Don't Be Stupid (You Know I Love You)" (LP version) – 3:35
 "Don't Be Stupid (You Know I Love You)" (dance mix full length) – 4:46
 "Don't Be Stupid (You Know I Love You)" (enhanced video clip)

European CD single
 "Don't Be Stupid (You Know I Love You)" (dance mix single) – 4:11
 "You've Got a Way" (Notting Hill Remix) – 3:25

European maxi-CD single
 "Don't Be Stupid (You Know I Love You)" (dance mix single) – 4:11
 "You've Got a Way" (Notting Hill Remix) – 3:25
 "Don't Be Stupid (You Know I Love You)" (dance mix full length) – 4:43
 "Don't Be Stupid (You Know I Love You)" (LP version) – 3:34

UK CD single
 "Don't Be Stupid (You Know I Love You)" (dance mix)
 "Don't Be Stupid (You Know I Love You)" (international LP version)
 "(If You're Not in It for Love) I'm Outta Here!" (dance mix)
 "Don't Be Stupid (You Know I Love You)" (video)

UK cassette single
 "Don't Be Stupid (You Know I Love You)" (dance mix)
 "Don't Be Stupid (You Know I Love You)" (international LP version)

Credits and personnel
Credits are taken from the Come On Over album booklet.

Studio
 Recorded and mastered at Masterfonics (Nashville, Tennessee)

Personnel

 Shania Twain – writing, vocals, background vocals
 Robert John "Mutt" Lange – writing, background vocals, production
 Biff Watson – guitars
 Dann Huff – guitars, guitar textures, six-string bass, talk box
 Brent Mason – electric guitar
 Paul Franklin – pedal steel guitar
 Joe Chemay – electric and fretless bass
 Larry Franklin – fiddle
 Bow Bros – gang fiddles
 John Jarvis – Wurlitzer
 Paul Leim – drums
 Mike Shipley – mixing
 Olle Romo – programming, Pro Tools, sequencing, editing
 Glenn Meadows – mastering

Charts and sales

Weekly charts

Year-end charts

Sales

|}

Release history

References

1997 singles
1997 songs
2000 singles
Canadian Country Music Association Video of the Year videos
Mercury Records singles
Shania Twain songs
Song recordings produced by Robert John "Mutt" Lange
Songs written by Robert John "Mutt" Lange
Songs written by Shania Twain